The molecular formula C25H38O3 (molar mass: 386.57 g/mol) may refer to:

 AM-2389
 Dexanabinol (HU-211)
 HU-210
 Testosterone isocaproate
 Testosterone caproate

Molecular formulas